George R. Dennis (1822–1882) was a U.S. Senator from Maryland from 1873 to 1879, and also served in the Maryland State Senate. Senator Dennis may also refer to:

Elias Smith Dennis (1812–1894), Illinois State Senate
John Dennis (Missouri politician) (1917–2000), Missouri State Senate
Leonard G. Dennis (died 1885), Florida State Senate
Max Dennis (1925–1986), Ohio State Senate
Rembert Dennis (1915–1992), South Carolina State Senate
William M. Dennis (1810–1882), Wisconsin State Senate